Regina Doherty (born 26 January 1971) is an Irish Fine Gael politician who has served as Deputy leader of Seanad Éireann since 2022. She was Leader of the Seanad from 2020 to 2022, and is Leader of Fine Gael in the Seanad since June 2020. She has been a Senator since June 2020, after being nominated by the Taoiseach. She served as Minister for Employment Affairs and Social Protection from 2017 to 2020 and Government Chief Whip from 2016 to 2017. She was a Teachta Dála (TD) for the Meath East constituency from 2011 to 2020.

Political career
Doherty was a member of the Meath County Council for the Dunshaughlin local electoral area from 2009 to 2011. She was a member of the Oireachtas committees for Health, Finance and the implementation of the Good Friday Agreement during the 31st Dáil. She was also a member of the Constitutional Convention, and was the Chairperson of the Fine Gael committee for health and children. In May 2015, following the claims of IRA involvement of the cover-up of sexual abuse by Máiría Cahill, she was provided with names of a number of alleged abusers which she passed on to the Gardaí who are investigating the issue. She was re-elected to the Dáil at the 2016 general election. She was appointed to the new Dáil reform committee on 22 March 2016. Following the formation of a Fine Gael minority government in May 2016, Doherty was appointed as Minister of State at the Department of the Taoiseach with responsibility as Government Chief Whip, in attendance at cabinet.

On 14 June 2017, she was appointed Minister for Employment Affairs and Social Protection, by Taoiseach Leo Varadkar.

In July 2017, Doherty confirmed that she had lodged a complaint with the Garda Síochána against political blogger and academic Catherine Kelly. Kelly said that she was cautioned by Gardaí about her social media posts and online articles, which referenced Regina Doherty. In the Dáil, it was stated that a U.S.-based academic experienced a "sinister and chilling experience" in an Irish airport where she was detained by gardaí and told not to tweet about Doherty or publish any material relevant to her again. In September 2017, it was revealed that she was going to repay an "unlawful" allowance of €15,800 that she received as Government Chief Whip in direct contravention of the law which states that "no allowance can be paid to a party whip if the person is a Minister or Minister of State".

In January 2018, Doherty announced the launch of the consultation process under the review of the Gender Recognition Act 2015, to further expanding the Gender Recognition Act to include those under 18 and non-binary people. In May 2018, Doherty participated in the Opening Plenary Session - Listening Today for Better Social Policies Tomorrow, in the OECD Policy forum in Canada.

In January 2019, Doherty briefed the Irish Cabinet, warning that while her department was well fixed to pass emergency legislation to continue social welfare payments in the event of Brexit, the UK may not be. It is understood that the British Government has agreed in principle to continue all payments, although the then Secretary of State for Work and Pensions, Amber Rudd, has been unable to guarantee that the necessary legislation will be passed by 29 March 2019. Also in January 2019, Doherty was appointed director of elections for Fine Gael for the 2019 European elections.

COVID-19 response
Doherty was appointed to the Cabinet Sub-Committee on COVID-19, it published a National Action Plan on 16 March. On 16 March 2020, Doherty announced the COVID-19 Pandemic Unemployment Payment of €350.00, which would be available for six weeks.

On 19 March 2020, Doherty announced that all welfare would be distributed each fortnight instead of the traditional weekly, so as to limit the number of people gathering in post offices. On 17 April, she announced that the General Register Office has put arrangements in place for parents to send in their birth registration forms by email or post. Up to then, parents could only register the births of their children by visiting a General Register Office in person, a practice in place since 1864, when the first birth was registered.

In December 2021, Doherty opposed a motion calling on the government to support a TRIPS waiver on COVID-19 vaccine technology. Doherty withdrew her counter-motion following opposition from within the government coalition.

Seanad Éireann
At the general election in February 2020, Doherty was defeated in her Meath East constituency, losing to Darren O'Rourke of Sinn Féin, while her Fine Gael colleague Helen McEntee (Minister of State for European Affairs) was re-elected.

Nationally, Fine Gael lost twelve of its 47 seats in the election.  When the 33rd Dáil assembled on 20 February 2020 to elect a Taoiseach, none of the nominees was elected. Leo Varadkar resigned as Taoiseach, but under Article 28.11.2º of the Constitution, all members of the government continued to hold office until the appointment of their successors. Doherty therefore continued as Minister for Employment Affairs and Social Protection until the appointment of Micheál Martin as Taoiseach on 27 June, at the head of a three-part coalition government comprising Fianna Fáil, Fine Gael and the Green Party. On the same day, she was nominated by the Taoiseach to the Seanad, and also appointed as Leader of the Seanad. Her role is to direct government business in the Seanad.

Move to Dublin Fingal
In September 2020, it was announced that Doherty would seek Fine Gael's nomination to contest the next general election in the Dublin Fingal constituency. According to Doherty, she has connections to the area, with family in North County Dublin and having bought her first home in Swords, Dublin.

Business
In January 2013, her IT consultancy company went into liquidation with debts of €280,000, including €60,000 due to the Revenue Commissioners.

References

External links

Regina Doherty's page on the Fine Gael website

1971 births
Living people
Alumni of Dublin Institute of Technology
Fine Gael TDs
Local councillors in County Meath
Members of the 31st Dáil
Members of the 32nd Dáil
Ministers of State of the 32nd Dáil
Women government ministers of the Republic of Ireland
Ministers for Social Affairs (Ireland)
Women ministers of state of the Republic of Ireland
Government Chief Whip (Ireland)
21st-century women Teachtaí Dála
Members of the 26th Seanad
Nominated members of Seanad Éireann
21st-century women members of Seanad Éireann